The Strasbourg Agreement can refer to: 

 Strasbourg Agreement (1675), regarding the use of chemical weapons
 Strasbourg Agreement Concerning the International Patent Classification (1971)

See also
 Strasbourg Convention (disambiguation)